Kiripalogo is a rural municipality located in the Boussou Department in the province of Zondoma in the Northern region of Burkina Faso.

Geography 
Kiripalogo is 12 km northwest of town of Boussou, the capital of the department, 5 km southwest of Posso, and about 50 km southwest of Gourcy.

History 
Kiripalogo is located in the former Mossi kingdom.

Health and educational resources 
The nearest health centre is the Health and Social Promotion Centre (CSPS) in Posso, while the medical centre is in Gourcy. Kiripalogo has since 2014 one of the three general education colleges (CEG) of the department. The departmental high school is located in Boussou.

Gallery

References 

Zondoma Province
Populated places in the Nord Region (Burkina Faso)